Vahagn is a god in Armenian mythology.

Vahagn may also refer to:

Vahagn (name), an Armenian male given name
Invocations to Vahakn, Op. 54, no. 1 (1945), a composition for piano and percussion by the American composer Alan Hovhaness
Symphony No. 10, "Vahaken," Op. 184 (1944, rev. 1965), by Alan Hovhaness